The 2008–09 Anaheim Ducks season was the 16th season of operation (15th season of play) for the National Hockey League franchise. The Ducks first game of the season was an away game, held on October 9, 2008, against the San Jose Sharks.

Schedule and results

Preseason

|- align="center" bgcolor="#bbffbb"
| 1 || September 24 || Sharks || 6–4 || || Giguere (1–0–0) || Greiss (0–1–0) || 15,243 || 1–0–0 || Honda Center || W1
|- align="center" bgcolor="#ffbbbb"
| 2 || September 26 || @ Sharks || 5–2 || || Nabokov (1–0–0) || Hiller (0–1–0) || 17,271 || 1–1–0 || HP Pavilion at San Jose || L1
|- align="center" bgcolor="#bbffbb"
| 3 || September 27 || @ Coyotes || 3–1 || || LeNeveu (1–0–0) || Bryzgalov (0–1–0) || 8,417 || 2–1–0 || Jobing.com Arena || W1
|- align="center" bgcolor="#ffdddd"
| 4 || September 28 || Canucks || 5–4 || SO || Sanford (1–0–0) || LeNeveu (1–0–1) || 16,481 || 2–1–1 || Honda Center || O1
|- align="center" bgcolor="#bbffbb"
| 5 || September 30 || @ Kings || 2–1 || SO || Hiller (1–1–0) || LaBarbera (0–1–0) || 11,904 || 3–1–1 || Staples Center || W1
|-

|- align="center" bgcolor="#bbffbb"
| 6 || October 1 || Kings || 3–2 || OT || Giguere (2–0–0) || Ersberg (0–1–0) || 16,410 || 4–1–1 || Honda Center || W2
|- align="center" bgcolor="#bbffbb"
| 7 || October 3 || Coyotes || 4–1 || || Hiller (2–1–0) || Tellqvist (0–2–0) || 16,371 || 5–1–1 || Honda Center || W3
|- align="center" bgcolor="#bbffbb"
| 8 || October 5 || @ Canucks || 4–3 || OT || Giguere (3–0–0) || Luongo (3–1–0) || 18,630 || 6–1–1 || General Motors Place || W4
|-

Regular season 

|- align="center" bgcolor="#ffbbbb"
| 1 || October 9 || @ Sharks || 4–1 || || Nabokov (1–0–0) || Giguere (0–1–0) || 17,496 || 0–1–0 || HP Pavilion at San Jose || L1 || bgcolor="ffbbbb" | 0
|- align="center" bgcolor="#ffbbbb"
| 2 || October 12 || Coyotes || 4–2 || || Bryzgalov (2–0–0) || Giguere (0–2–0) || 17,174 || 0–2–0 || Honda Center || L2 || bgcolor="ffbbbb" | 0
|- align="center" bgcolor="#ffbbbb"
| 3 || October 14 || @ Kings || 6–3 || || LaBarbera (1–2–0) || Giguere (0–3–0) || 14,451 || 0–3–0 || Staples Center || L3 || bgcolor="ffbbbb" | 0
|- align="center" bgcolor="#ffbbbb"
| 4 || October 15 || Oilers || 3–2 || || Garon (2–0–0) || Hiller (0–1–0) || 16,604 || 0–4–0 || Honda Center || L4 || bgcolor="ffbbbb" | 0
|- align="center" bgcolor="#bbffbb"
| 5 || October 17 || Sharks || 4–0 || || Giguere (1–3–0) || Nabokov (3–1–0) || 17,174 || 1–4–0 || Honda Center || W1 || bgcolor="ffbbbb" | 2
|- align="center" bgcolor="#ffbbbb"
| 6 || October 19 || Hurricanes || 3–1 || || Leighton (2–0–0) || Giguere (1–4–0) || 16,847 || 1–5–0 || Honda Center || L1 || bgcolor="ffbbbb" | 2
|- align="center" bgcolor="#bbffbb"
| 7 || October 21 || @ Maple Leafs || 3–2 || SO || Giguere (2–4–0) || Joseph (0–1–1) || 19,222 || 2–5–0 || Air Canada Centre || W1 || bgcolor="ffbbbb" | 4
|- align="center" bgcolor="#bbffbb"
| 8 || October 24 || @ Senators || 4–3 || || Hiller (1–1–0) || Auld (1–1–0) || 19,762 || 3–5–0 || Scotiabank Place || W2 || bgcolor="ffbbbb" | 6
|- align="center" bgcolor="#bbffbb"
| 9 || October 25 || @ Canadiens || 6–4 || || Giguere (3–4–0) || Price (4–1–1) || 21,273 || 4–5–0 || Bell Centre || W3 || bgcolor="ffbbbb" | 8
|- align="center" bgcolor="#bbffbb"
| 10 || October 27 || @ Blue Jackets || 3–2 || || Giguere (4–4–0) || Norrena (0–3–0) || 10,494 || 5–5–0 || Nationwide Arena || W4 || bgcolor="bbcaff" | 10
|- align="center" bgcolor="#bbffbb"
| 11 || October 29 || Red Wings || 4–5 || OT || Giguere (5–4–0) || Osgood (5–1–2) || 17,174 || 6–5–0 || Honda Center || W5 || bgcolor="bbcaff" | 12
|- align="center" bgcolor="#ffdddd"
| 12 || October 31 || Canucks || 7–6 || SO || Luongo (6–4–0) || Hiller (1–1–1) || 16,704 || 6–5–1 || Honda Center || O1 || bgcolor="bbcaff" | 13
|-

|- align="center" bgcolor="#bbffbb"
| 13 || November 2 || Flames || 2–3 || || Giguere (6–4–0) || Kiprusoff (14–8–2) || 16,965 || 7–5–1 || Honda Center || W1 || bgcolor="bbcaff" | 15
|- align="center" bgcolor="#bbffbb"
| 14 || November 4 || @ Kings || 1–0 || OT || Giguere (7–4–0) || Ersberg (0–1–1) || 14,327 || 8–5–1 || Staples Center || W2 || bgcolor="bbcaff" | 17
|- align="center" bgcolor="#bbffbb"
| 15 || November 5 || Blues || 5–2 || || Hiller (2–1–1) || Mason (0–4–0) || 16,144 || 9–5–1 || Honda Center || W3 || bgcolor="bbcaff" | 19
|- align="center" bgcolor="#ffbbbb"
| 16 || November 7 || Stars || 5–2 || || Turco (4–5–2) || Giguere (7–5–0) || 17,048 || 9–6–1 || Honda Center || L1 || bgcolor="bbcaff" | 19
|- align="center" bgcolor="#ffbbbb"
| 17 || November 9 || Panthers || 3–1 || || Anderson (2–1–1) || Giguere (7–6–0) || 16,951 || 9–7–1 || Honda Center || L2 || bgcolor="bbcaff" | 19
|- align="center" bgcolor="#ffdddd"
| 18 || November 14 || Predators || 4–3 || OT || Ellis (6–7–1) || Giguere (7–6–1) || 16,485 || 9–7–2 || Honda Center || O1 || bgcolor="bbcaff" | 20
|- align="center" bgcolor="#bbffbb"
| 19 || November 16 || Kings || 2–0 || || Hiller (3–1–1) || Ersberg (4–3–1) || 17,174 || 10–7–2 || Honda Center || W1 || bgcolor="bbcaff" | 22
|- align="center" bgcolor="#ffbbbb"
| 20 || November 19 || Capitals || 6–4 || || Theodore (6–3–1) || Giguere (7–7–1) || 16,076 || 10–8–2 || Honda Center || L1 || bgcolor="bbcaff" | 22
|- align="center" bgcolor="#ffdddd"
| 21 || November 21 || @ Blues || 3–2 || OT || Legace (6–3–1) || Giguere (7–7–2) || 19,150 || 10–8–3 || Scottrade Center || O1 || bgcolor="bbcaff" | 23
|- align="center" bgcolor="#bbffbb"
| 22 || November 22 || @ Stars || 2–1 || SO || Hiller (4–1–1) || Turco (5–8–4) || 17,734 || 11–8–3 || American Airlines Center || W1 || bgcolor="bbcaff" | 25
|- align="center" bgcolor="#bbffbb"
| 23 || November 24 || Avalanche || 4–1 || || Giguere (8–7–2) || Budaj (7–10–0) || 16,632 || 12–8–3 || Honda Center || W2 || bgcolor="bbcaff" | 27
|- align="center" bgcolor="#bbffbb"
| 24 || November 28 || Blackhawks || 1–0 || || Hiller (5–1–1) || Huet (3–4–2) || 16,994 || 13–8–3 || Honda Center || W3 || bgcolor="bbcaff" | 29
|- align="center" bgcolor="#bbffbb"
| 25 || November 30 || @ Hurricanes || 4–1 || || Hiller (6–1–1) || Leighton (4–4–0) || 14,191 || 14–8–3 || RBC Center || W4 || bgcolor="bbcaff" | 31
|-

|- align="center" bgcolor="#ffbbbb"
| 26 || December 1 || @ Red Wings || 2–1 || || Osgood (10–1–4) || Hiller (6–2–1) || 18,862 || 14–9–3 || Joe Louis Arena || L1 || bgcolor="bbcaff" | 31
|- align="center" bgcolor="#ffbbbb"
| 27 || December 3 || @ Blackhawks || 4–2 || || Huet (4–5–2) || Hiller (6–3–1) || 21,574 || 14–10–3 || United Center || L2 || bgcolor="bbcaff" | 31
|- align="center" bgcolor="#bbffbb"
| 28 || December 7 || Blue Jackets || 5–3 || || Giguere (9–7–2) || Leclaire (4–5–0) || 16,914 || 15–10–3 || Honda Center || W1 || bgcolor="bbcaff" | 33
|- align="center" bgcolor="#bbffbb"
| 29 || December 10 || Blues || 4–2 || || Giguere (10–7–2) || Mason (3–7–1) || 16,058 || 16–10–3 || Honda Center || W2 || bgcolor="bbcaff" | 35
|- align="center" bgcolor="#ffbbbb"
| 30 || December 11 || @ Sharks || 2–0 || || Nabokov (16–2–1) || Hiller (6–4–1) || 17,496 || 16–11–3 || HP Pavilion at San Jose || L1 || bgcolor="bbcaff" | 35
|- align="center" bgcolor="#bbffbb"
| 31 || December 14 || Wild || 4–2 || || Giguere (11–7–2) || Harding (1–3–0) || 16,577 || 17–11–3 || Honda Center || W1 || bgcolor="bbcaff" | 37
|- align="center" bgcolor="#ffbbbb"
| 32 || December 16 || Rangers || 3–1 || || Lundqvist (18–9–2) || Hiller (6–5–1) || 16,921 || 17–12–3 || Honda Center || L1 || bgcolor="bbcaff" | 37
|- align="center" bgcolor="#bbffbb"
| 33 || December 19 || @ Oilers || 3–2 || SO || Hiller (7–5–1) || Roloson (6–5–3) || 16,839 || 18–12–3 || Rexall Place || W1 || bgcolor="bbcaff" | 39
|- align="center" bgcolor="#ffbbbb"
| 34 || December 22 || @ Canucks || 4–3 || || Sanford (6–5–0) || Hiller (7–6–1) || 18,630 || 18–13–3 || General Motors Place || L1 || bgcolor="bbcaff" | 39
|- align="center" bgcolor="#ffbbbb"
| 35 || December 23 || @ Flames || 4–3 || || Kiprusoff (19–10–3) || Giguere (11–8–2) || 19,289 || 18–14–3 || Pengrowth Saddledome || L2 || bgcolor="bbcaff" | 39
|- align="center" bgcolor="#ffdddd"
| 36 || December 27 || @ Stars || 4–3 || OT || Turco (14–12–5) || Giguere (11–8–3) || 18,532 || 18–14–4 || American Airlines Center || O1 || bgcolor="bbcaff" | 40
|- align="center" bgcolor="#bbffbb"
| 37 || December 28 || @ Blues || 4–3 || || Hiller (8–6–1) || Mason (4–10–1) || 19,150 || 19–14–4 || Scottrade Center || W1 || bgcolor="bbcaff" | 42
|- align="center" bgcolor="#ffbbbb"
| 38 || December 31 || Blue Jackets || 2–0 || || Mason (12–7–1) || Giguere (11–9–3) || 16,758 || 19–15–4 || Honda Center || L1 || bgcolor="bbcaff" | 42
|-

|- align="center" bgcolor="#ffdddd"
| 39 || January 2 || Flyers || 5–4 || SO || Biron (13–7–4) || Giguere (11–9–4) || 17,597 || 19–15–5 || Honda Center || O1 || bgcolor="bbcaff" | 43
|- align="center" bgcolor="#bbffbb"
| 40 || January 4 || Coyotes || 2–0 || || Hiller (9–6–1) || Bryzgalov (13–13–4) || 16,878 || 20–15–5 || Honda Center || W1 || bgcolor="bbcaff" | 45
|- align="center" bgcolor="#bbffbb"
| 41 || January 6 || Kings || 3–1 || || Hiller (10–6–1) || Ersberg (8–6–2) || 17,174 || 21–15–5 || Honda Center || W2 || bgcolor="bbcaff" | 47
|- align="center" bgcolor="#ffbbbb"
| 42 || January 8 || @ Kings || 4–3 || || Quick (4–3–0) || Hiller (10–7–1) || 18,118 || 21–16–5 || Staples Center || L1 || bgcolor="bbcaff" | 47
|- align="center" bgcolor="#ffbbbb"
| 43 || January 9 || Lightning || 4–3 || || Ramo (1–0–0) || Hiller (10–8–1) || 17,174 || 21–17–5 || Honda Center || L2 || bgcolor="bbcaff" | 47
|- align="center" bgcolor="#bbffbb"
| 44 || January 11 || Devils || 4–3 || || Giguere (12–9–4) || Clemmensen (15–9–1) || 17,331 || 22–17–5 || Honda Center || W1 || bgcolor="bbcaff" | 49
|- align="center" bgcolor="#ffbbbb"
| 45 || January 14 || Red Wings || 4–3 || || Osgood (15–2–5) || Giguere (12–10–4) || 17,525 || 22–18–5 || Honda Center || L1 || bgcolor="bbcaff" | 49
|- align="center" bgcolor="#ffbbbb"
| 46 || January 16 || @ Penguins || 3–1 || || Fleury (14–11–2) || Giguere (12–11–4) || 17,005 || 22–19–5 || Mellon Arena || L2 || bgcolor="bbcaff" | 49
|- align="center" bgcolor="#bbffbb"
| 47 || January 17 || @ Wild || 3–0 || || Hiller (11–8–1) || Backstrom (21–14–2) || 18,568 || 23–19–5 || Xcel Energy Center || W1 || bgcolor="bbcaff" | 51
|- align="center" bgcolor="#ffbbbb"
| 48 || January 20 || @ Rangers || 4–2 || || Lundqvist (24–13–3) || Hiller (11–9–1) || 18,200 || 23–20–5 || Madison Square Garden || L1 || bgcolor="bbcaff" | 51
|- align="center" bgcolor="#ffbbbb"
| 49 || January 21 || @ Islanders || 2–1 || || Danis (1–5–1) || Giguere (12–12–4) || 11,853 || 23–21–5 || Nassau Memorial Coliseum || L1 || bgcolor="bbcaff" | 51
|- align="center" bgcolor="bbcaff"
|colspan="3" bgcolor="#bbcaff"| January 25: All-Star Game (East wins—Box) || 12–11 || SO || Price (MON) || Giguere (ANA) || 21,273 || || Bell Centre || colspan=2 | Montreal, QC
|- align="center" bgcolor="#bbffbb"
| 50 || January 27 || @ Coyotes || 7–3 || || Hiller (12–9–1) || Bryzgalov (18–16–4) || 15,383 || 24–21–5 || Jobing.com Arena || W1 || bgcolor="bbcaff" | 53
|- align="center" bgcolor="#ffbbbb"
| 51 || January 28 || Blackhawks || 3–2 || || Khabibulin (14–4–5) || Hiller (12–10–1) || 17,193 || 24–22–5 || Honda Center || L1 || bgcolor="bbcaff" | 53
|- align="center" bgcolor="#bbffbb"
| 52 || January 31 || @ Avalanche || 4–3 || || Hiller (13–10–1) || Budaj (14–20–1) || 17,652 || 25–22–5 || Pepsi Center || W1 || bgcolor="bbcaff" | 55
|-

|- align="center" bgcolor="#bbffbb"
| 53 || February 2 || Sabres || 3–2 || || Hiller (14–10–1) || Lalime (2–7–1) || 16,874 || 26–22–5 || Honda Center || W2 || bgcolor="bbcaff" | 57
|- align="center" bgcolor="#ffbbbb"
| 54 || February 4 || @ Wild || 3–0 || || Backstrom (25–16–2) || Hiller (14–11–1) || 18,568 || 26–23–5 || Xcel Energy Center || L1 || bgcolor="bbcaff" | 57
|- align="center" bgcolor="#ffbbbb"
| 55 || February 5 || @ Predators || 4–2 || || Rinne (14–8–0) || Giguere (12–13–4) || 14,877 || 26–24–5 || Sommet Center || L2 || bgcolor="bbcaff" | 57
|- align="center" bgcolor="#bbffbb"
| 56 || February 7 || @ Flames || 2–1 || || Giguere (13–13–4) || McElhinney (0–3–1) || 19,289 || 27–24–5 || Pengrowth Saddledome || W1 || bgcolor="bbcaff" | 59
|- align="center" bgcolor="#bbffbb"
| 57 || February 11 || Flames || 3–2 || OT || Giguere (14–13–4) || Kiprusoff (31–15–4) || 17,270 || 28–24–5 || Honda Center || W2 || bgcolor="bbcaff" | 61
|- align="center" bgcolor="#ffbbbb"
| 58 || February 15 || Thrashers || 8–4 || || Lehtonen (11–17–2) || Giguere (14–14–4) || 17,228 || 28–25–5 || Honda Center || L1 || bgcolor="bbcaff" | 61
|- align="center" bgcolor="#ffbbbb"
| 59 || February 18 || Kings || 4–3 || || Quick (12–7–1) || Hiller (14–12–1) || 17,089 || 28–26–5 || Honda Center || L2 || bgcolor="#ffbbbb" | 61
|- align="center" bgcolor="#ffbbbb"
| 60 || February 20 || @ Red Wings || 5–2 || || Conklin (21–7–1) || Giguere (14–15–4) || 20,066 || 28–27–5 || Joe Louis Arena || L3 || bgcolor="#ffbbbb" | 61
|- align="center" bgcolor="#bbffbb"
| 61 || February 21 || @ Blue Jackets || 5–2 || || Giguere (15–15–4) || Mason (23–13–3) || 18,628 || 29–27–5 || Nationwide Arena || W1 || bgcolor="#ffbbbb" | 63
|- align="center" bgcolor="#bbffbb"
| 62 || February 24 || @ Sabres || 3–2 || || Giguere (16–15–4) || Lalime (2–8–1) || 18,690 || 30–27–5 || HSBC Arena || W2 || bgcolor="#ffbbbb" | 65
|- align="center" bgcolor="#ffbbbb"
| 63 || February 26 || @ Bruins || 6–0 || || Thomas (27–8–5) || Giguere (16–16–4) || 17,565 || 30–28–5 || TD Banknorth Garden || L1 || bgcolor="#ffbbbb" | 65
|- align="center" bgcolor="#bbffbb"
| 64 || February 28 || @ Stars || 4–3 || || Giguere (17–16–4) || Turco (28–23–7) || 18,171 || 31–28–5 || American Airlines Center || W1 || bgcolor="bbcaff" | 67
|-

|- align="center" bgcolor="#ffdddd"
| 65 || March 3 || @ Blackhawks || 2–3 || OT || Huet (18–12–3) || Giguere (17–16–5) || 21,619 || 31–28–6 || United Center || O1 || bgcolor="ffbbbb" | 68
|- align="center" bgcolor="#ffbbbb"
| 66 || March 6 || Stars || 3–2 || || Turco (30–23–8) || Giguere (17–17–5) || 17,380 || 31–29–6 || Honda Center || L1 || bgcolor="ffbbbb" | 68
|- align="center" bgcolor="#ffbbbb"
| 67 || March 8 || Wild || 3–2 || || Backstrom (30–19–4) || Hiller (14–13–1) || 17,300 || 31–30–6 || Honda Center || L2 || bgcolor="ffbbbb" | 68
|- align="center" bgcolor="#bbffbb"
| 68 || March 11 || Canucks || 3–4 || OT || Hiller (15–13–1) || Luongo (23–9–6) || 16,967 || 32–30–6 || Honda Center || W1 || bgcolor="ffbbbb" | 70
|- align="center" bgcolor="#ffbbbb"
| 69 || March 15 || Sharks || 1–0 || || Nabokov (34–8–7) || Hiller (15–14–1) ||| 17,511 || 32–31–6 || Honda Center || L1 || bgcolor="ffbbbb" | 70
|- align="center" bgcolor="#bbffbb"
| 70 || March 18 || Predators || 3–4 || OT || Giguere (18–17–5) || Rinne (24–11–2) || 16,181 || 33–31–6 || Honda Center || W1 || bgcolor="ffbbbb" | 72
|- align="center" bgcolor="#bbffbb"
| 71 || March 19 || @ Coyotes || 3–2 || SO || Hiller (16–14–1) || Bryzgalov (22–28–6) || 12,739 || 34–31–6 || Jobing.com Arena || W2 || bgcolor="ffbbbb" | 74
|- align="center" bgcolor="#bbffbb"
| 72 || March 22 || Coyotes || 2–6 || || Hiller (17–14–1) || Bryzgalov (23–29–6) || 17,215 || 35–31–6 || Honda Center || W3 || bgcolor="ffbbbb" | 76
|- align="center" bgcolor="#bbffbb"
| 73 || March 24 || @ Predators || 2–1 || SO || Giguere (19–17–5) || Rinne (24–11–4) || 16,418 || 36–31–6 || Sommet Center || W4 || bgcolor="bbcaff" | 78
|- align="center" bgcolor="#bbffbb"
| 74 || March 25 || @ Avalanche || 7–2 || || Hiller (18–14–1) || Budaj (19–28–2) || 16,279 || 37–31–6 || Pepsi Center || W5 || bgcolor="bbcaff" | 80
|- align="center" bgcolor="#ffbbbb"
| 75 || March 27 || Oilers || 5–3 || || Roloson (27–20–9) || Giguere (19–18–5) || 17,257 || 37–32–6 || Honda Center || L1 || bgcolor="ffbbbb" | 80
|- align="center" bgcolor="#bbffbb"
| 76 || March 29 || Avalanche || 1–4 || || Hiller (19–14–1) || Budaj (19–29–2) || 17,182 || 38–32–6 || Honda Center || W1 || bgcolor="ffbbbb" | 82
|- align="center" bgcolor="#bbffbb"
| 77 || March 31 || @ Oilers || 5–3 || || Hiller (20–14–1) || Roloson (27–22–9) || 16,839 || 39–32–6 || Rexall Place || W2 || bgcolor="bbcaff" | 84
|-

|- align="center" bgcolor="#bbffbb"
| 78 || April 2 || @ Canucks || 6–5 || SO || Hiller (21–14–1) || Luongo (30–11–7) || 18,630 || 40–32–6 || General Motors Place || W3 || bgcolor="bbcaff" | 86
|- align="center" bgcolor="#bbffbb"
| 79 || April 4 || @ Sharks || 5–2 || || Hiller (22–14–1) || Nabokov (40–10–8) || 17,496 || 41–32–6 || HP Pavilion at San Jose || W4 || bgcolor="bbcaff" | 88
|- align="center" bgcolor="#ffbbbb"
| 80 || April 5 || Sharks || 3–2 || || Boucher (12–6–3) || Hiller (22–15–1) || 17,398 || 41–33–6 || Honda Center || L1 || bgcolor="bbcaff" | 88
|- align="center" style="background: #000078; color: white"
| 81 || April 10 || Stars || 4–3 || SO || Hiller (23–15–1) || Turco (33–31–10) || 17,531 || 42–33–6 || Honda Center || W1 || 90
|- align="center" bgcolor="#ffdddd"
| 82 || April 11 || @ Coyotes || 5–4 || SO || Bryzgalov (26–31–6) || Giguere (19–18–6) || 16,438 || 42–33–7 || Jobing.com Arena || O1 || bgcolor="bbcaff" | 91
|-

Post-season

The Anaheim Ducks ended the 2008–09 regular season as the Western Conference's eighth seed.

|- align="center" bgcolor="#bbffbb"
| 1 || April 16 || @ Sharks || 2–0 || || Hiller (1–0) || Nabokov (0–1) || 17,496 || 1–0 || HP Pavilion at San Jose || W1
|- align="center" bgcolor="#bbffbb"
| 2 || April 19 || @ Sharks || 3–2 || || Hiller (2–0) || Nabokov (0–2) || 17,496 || 2–0 || HP Pavilion at San Jose || W2
|- align="center" bgcolor="#ffbbbb"
| 3 || April 21 || Sharks || 4–3 || || Nabokov (1–2) || Hiller (2–1) || 16,277 || 2–1 || Honda Center || L1
|- align="center" bgcolor="#bbffbb"
| 4 || April 23 || Sharks || 4–0 || || Hiller (3–1) || Nabokov (1–3) || 16,830 || 3–1 || Honda Center || W1
|- align="center" bgcolor="#ffbbbb"
| 5 || April 25 || @ Sharks || 3–2 || OT || Nabokov (2–3) || Hiller (3–2) || 17,496 || 3–2 || HP Pavilion at San Jose || L1
|- align="center" bgcolor="#bbffbb"
| 6 || April 27 || Sharks || 4–1 || || Hiller (4–2) || Nabokov (2–4) || 17,174 || 4–2 || Honda Center || W1
|-

|- align="center" bgcolor="#ffbbbb"
| 1 || May 1 || @ Red Wings || 3–2 || || Osgood (5–0) || Hiller (4–3) || 20,066 || 0–1 || Joe Louis Arena || L1
|- align="center" bgcolor="#bbffbb"
| 2 || May 3 || @ Red Wings || 4–3 || OT || Hiller (5–3) || Osgood (5–1) || 20,066 || 1–1 || Joe Louis Arena || W1
|- align="center" bgcolor="#bbffbb"
| 3 || May 5 || Red Wings || 2–1 || || Hiller (6–3) || Osgood (5–2) || 17,174 || 2–1 || Honda Center || W2
|- align="center" bgcolor="#ffbbbb"
| 4 || May 7 || Red Wings || 6–3 || || Osgood (6–2) || Hiller (6–4) || 17,601 || 2–2 || Honda Center || L1
|- align="center" bgcolor="#ffbbbb"
| 5 || May 10 || @ Red Wings || 4–1 || || Osgood (7–2) || Hiller (6–5) || 20,066 || 2–3 || Joe Louis Arena || L2
|- align="center" bgcolor="#bbffbb"
| 6 || May 12 || Red Wings || 2–1 || || Hiller (7–5) || Osgood (7–3) || 17,174 || 3–3 || Honda Center || W1
|- align="center" bgcolor="#ffbbbb"
| 7 || May 14 || @ Red Wings || 4–3 || || Osgood (8–3) || Hiller (7–6) || 20,066 || 3–4 || Joe Louis Arena || L1
|-

Standings

Divisional standings

Conference standings

Player statistics

Skaters

Goaltenders

†Denotes player spent time with another team before joining Ducks. Stats reflect time with Ducks only.
‡Traded mid-season. 
Bold/italics denotes franchise record

Awards and records

Records
 Ryan Getzlaf – Most assists in a season (66)
 Bobby Ryan – Most rookie goals in a season (31)
 Bobby Ryan – Most rookie points in a season (57)

Milestones

Transactions
 June 27: Todd Bertuzzi was placed on unconditional waivers as the Ducks will buy out the final year of his contract.
 September 16: Mathieu Schneider was placed on waivers.
 September 17: Mathieu Schneider cleared waivers.
 September 28: Re-signed Teemu Selanne to a two-year contract.

Trades

 Pick later traded to Phoenix Coyotes.
 Pick later traded to Buffalo Sabres

Free agents

Claimed from waivers

Draft picks
The Ducks' picks at the 2008 NHL Entry Draft in Ottawa, Ontario.

See also 
 Anaheim Ducks
 Honda Center
 2008–09 NHL season

Other Anaheim–based teams in 2008–09
Los Angeles Angels of Anaheim (Angel Stadium of Anaheim)
 2008 Los Angeles Angels of Anaheim season
 2009 Los Angeles Angels of Anaheim season

Farm teams
Iowa Chops (AHL) 
Bakersfield Condors (ECHL)

References

Anaheim Ducks seasons
Anaheim
Anaheim
Mighty Ducks of Anaheim
Mighty Ducks of Anaheim